Puya chilensis is a terrestrial bromeliad originating from the arid hillsides of Chile.

Description
An evergreen perennial, it forms large, dense rosettes of grey-green, strap-like leaves edged with hooked spines. Spreading by offsets, Puya chilensis can colonise large areas over time. Growth is slow and plants may take 20 years or more to flower. The outer two-thirds of the leaf blade bears outward-pointing spines which may be an adaptation to prevent herbivores from reaching the center of the plant. The plant is believed to be hazardous to sheep and birds which may become entangled in the spines of the leaves. If the animal dies, the plant may gain nutrients as the animal decomposes nearby, though this has not been confirmed. For this reason, Puya chilensis has earned the nickname "sheep-eating plant". If true, this would make Puya chilensis a protocarnivorous plant. Fibers from the leaves are used to weave durable fishing-nets.

Natural habitat

Conservation 

Puya chilensis is not considered threatened. It is also cultivated in many parts of the world.
In its natural arid environment, plants can be highly flammable and are susceptible to damage from fires that are often the result of human action. Land clearance is an increasing threat.

References

Further reading
 Shaw, Christine 2005. Architectural Plants. 
 Miles, Tim & Rowe, David & Smit, Tim 2003. The New Cornish Garden.

External links

chilensis
Chilean Matorral
Flora of central Chile
Garden plants
Drought-tolerant plants